Peter Gmoser (born 16 February 1971) is an Austrian equestrian. He competed at the 2000 Summer Olympics and the 2004 Summer Olympics.

References

External links
 

1971 births
Living people
Austrian male equestrians
Austrian dressage riders
Olympic equestrians of Austria
Equestrians at the 2000 Summer Olympics
Equestrians at the 2004 Summer Olympics
Sportspeople from Graz